Cúán úa Lothcháin was an Irish poet from Tethba, now in County Meath. He was the Chief Ollam of Ireland and died in 1024.

Born in the region of Tethba - part of the kingdom of Mide - Cúán acted as bard and propagandist for High King Máel Sechnaill mac Domnaill (died 1022).

The Annals of Ulster give his obit as- "U1024.3 Cuán ua Lothcháin, chief poet of Ireland, was killed in Tethba by the men of Tethba themselves. The party that killed him became putrid within the hour. That was a poet's miracle."

The Annals of the Four Masters give his obit as- "M1024.4 Cuan Ua Lothchain, chief poet of Ireland, and a learned historian, was slain in Teathbha, and the party who killed him became putrid in one hour; and this was a poet's miracle."

The Annals of Inisfallen give his obit as- "AI1024.6 Cúán. Ua Lothcháin, chief poet of Ireland and a historian, was slain by the men of Tethba; and the man who slew him, i.e. the son of Gilla Ultáin, son of Roduib, was killed forthwith."

The Annals of Loch Cé give his obit as- "LC1024.4 Cuan Ua Lochain, i.e. the chief poet of Erinn, was slain by the men of Tethfa. God performed a ‘poet's miracle,’ manifestly, on the party that killed him, for they died an evil death, and their bodies were not buried until wolves and birds preyed upon them."

The Chronicon Scotorum give his obit as- "Annal CS1024 Kalends. Cuán ua Lothcháin, chief poet of Ireland and an expert in tradition lore was killed in Tebtha, and those nine who killed him turned putrid and that is a poet's miracle."

References
The Life and work of Cúán ua Lothcháin, Clodagh Downey, in Ríocht na Midhe Journal, Vol XIX, 2008
Oxford Concise Companion to Irish Literature, Robert Welsh, 1996. 
Medieval Ireland: an encyclopedia - Page 118 Seán Duffy, Ailbhe MacShamhráin, James Moynes 2005.

1024 deaths
Medieval Irish poets
11th-century Irish poets
11th-century Irish writers
Year of birth unknown
Irish male poets
People from County Meath
Irish-language writers